The Telegraph Building may refer to:

195 Broadway, New York City, also known as the Telegraph Building
Telegraph Building, Shanghai
Telegraph Building (Harrisburg, Pennsylvania)
Daily Telegraph Building, London